Drest (also Drust and the hypocoristic Drostan) is the name of several Pictish people, including:

 Drest I of the Picts, Drest son of Erp, supposedly contemporary with Saint Patrick
 Drest II of the Picts, Drest Gurthinmoch
 Drest III of the Picts, Drest son of Uudrost
 Drest IV of the Picts, Drest son of Girom
 Drest V of the Picts, Drest son of Munait
 Drest VI of the Picts, Drest son of Dúngal, deposed 672
 Drest VII of the Picts, killed 729
 Drest VIII of the Picts, Drest son of Talorgan, died 787 ?
 Drust IX of the Picts, Drest son of Caustantín, died 836 or 837 ?
 Drest X of the Picts, Drest son of Ferat, fl. 840s
 Saint Drostan, founder of the monastery at Old Deer, fl. early 7th century